Dayville may refer to one of these U.S. locations:

Dayville, Alaska, a locale 
Dayville (CDP), Connecticut, a populated place
Dayville Historic District, a National Register of Historic Places-listed area within the CDP
Dayville, Indiana, a populated place
Dayville, Massachusetts, a populated place
Dayville, Oregon, a city in Grant County

See also
Daysville